Thomas Gardner (born March 17, 1998) is a Canadian professional soccer player who plays as a midfielder.

Club career

Whitecaps FC 2
Gardner signed with Whitecaps FC 2 on August 26, 2015. He made his professional debut 11 days later against Sacramento Republic FC. Gardner, along with fellow Whitecaps Academy products Matthew Baldisimo and Kadin Chung were praised during the club's USL playoff run in the 2016 USL season. In December 2016, Whitecaps FC 2 announced that Gardner would return to the club for the 2017 season. He played three seasons with Whitecaps FC 2 before the club ceased operations after the 2017 season. Rather than sign a USL deal with the Whitecaps new affiliate, Fresno FC, Gardner elected to evaluate playing opportunities in college.

TSS FC Rovers
After three seasons with Whitecaps FC 2, Gardner signed with TSS FC Rovers of the Premier Development League for the 2018 season.

Pacific FC
On November 12, 2018, Gardner was selected 6th overall by Pacific FC in the Canadian Premier League's inaugural U Sports draft. However he sustained a knee injury shortly after being drafted and was unable to play for three months, resulting in him not signing with Pacific. So, he went back to the University of British Columbia and played in the 2019 U Sports season. He was once again selected 12th overall by Pacific FC in the 2019 CPL–U Sports Draft.

FC Edmonton
In the 2021 CPL-U Sports Draft, he was selected first overall by FC Edmonton. On March 23, 2021, Gardner signed a development contract with the club. Gardner appeared in 10 games with the Eddies before returning to the University of British Columbia.

Varsity FC
In 2022, Gardner joined Varsity FC in League1 British Columbia.

International career
Gardner qualifies to play for Canada, where he and his father were born, or Indonesia, where his mother was born.

In 2013, Gardner participated in U-15 evaluation camps for the Canadian men's program and played in the Copa Mexico de Naciones Sub-15. The following year, he participated in camps for the Canadian U17 team and played at the 2014 Tournoi Montaigu. He subsequently participated in another U17 camp in 2015, but was not called up for competitive matches.

References

External links

Whitecaps bio

1998 births
Living people
Canadian sportspeople of Indonesian descent
Canadian Premier League first-overall draft picks
Canadian soccer players
FC Edmonton draft picks
Pacific FC draft picks
Whitecaps FC 2 players
TSS FC Rovers players
FC Edmonton players
Association football midfielders
Soccer people from British Columbia
USL Championship players
USL League Two players
UBC Thunderbirds soccer players
Sportspeople from North Vancouver
League1 British Columbia players
Nautsa’mawt FC players